Lyric Pieces is a collection of 66 short pieces for solo piano written by Edvard Grieg. They were published in 10 volumes, from 1867 (Op. 12) to 1901 (Op. 71). The collection includes several of his best known pieces, such as Wedding Day at Troldhaugen (Bryllupsdag på Troldhaugen), To Spring (Til våren), March of the Trolls (Trolltog), and Butterfly (Sommerfugl).

The theme of the first piece in the set, Arietta, was one of the composer's favorite melodies. He used it to complete the cycle in his last lyric piece, Remembrances (Efterklang) — this time as a waltz.

The first complete recording of the Lyric Pieces was recorded and released in the Soviet Union by Alexander Goldenweiser in the 1950s. In 2002, Norwegian pianist Leif Ove Andsnes recorded a CD with 24 of the lyric pieces on Grieg's own 1892 Steinway grand piano at Troldhaugen, the composer's residence. Among other notable pianists to have made recordings of the collection are Håkon Austbø, Aldo Ciccolini, Andrei Gavrilov, Walter Gieseking, Emil Gilels, Stephen Hough, Eva Knardahl, Juhani Lagerspetz, Daniel Levy, Irina Mejoueva, Isabel Mourão, Gerhard Oppitz, Javier Perianes, Sviatoslav Richter and Einar Steen-Nøkleberg. A few recordings and piano rolls of Grieg himself performing also exist, and they have been published by the Norwegian record label Simax.

Four of the six pieces from Book V, Op. 54, were orchestrated under the title of Lyric Suite.  Both Grieg and Anton Seidl had a hand in the orchestrations.  Grieg also orchestrated two of the pieces from Book IX, Op. 68.

Complete listing

Even though it was published in several volumes, some publishers, such as Edition Peters, have numbered the pieces as a whole, thereby numbering the 66 pieces in order, instead of numbering each volume individually. The movement list is as follows:

Book I, Op. 12 (composed 1866-7?; published 1867):

 Arietta
 Vals (Waltz)
 Vektersang (Watchman's song, after Macbeth)
 Alfedans (Elves' dance)
 Folkevise (Popular melody)
 Norsk (Norwegian melody)
 Albumblad (Albumleaf)
 Fedrelandssang (National song)

Book II, Op. 38 (composed 1883 except where noted; published 1883):
 Berceuse
 Folkevise (Folk-song)
 Melodi (Melody)
 Halling (Dance)
 Springdans (Spring dance)
 Elegi (Elegy)
 Vals (Waltz, originally composed 1866; revised 1883)
 Kanon (Canon, composed ca. 1877-8?; revised 1883)

Book III, Op. 43 (composed probably 1886; published 1886; ded. Isidor Seiss):

 Sommerfugl (Butterfly)
 Ensom vandrer (Solitary traveller)
 I hjemmet (In my homeland)
 Liten fugl (Little bird)
 Erotikk (Erotikon)
 Til våren (To spring)

Book IV, Op. 47 (composed 1886-8 except where noted; published 1888):
 Valse-Impromptu
 Albumblad (Albumleaf)
 Melodi (Melody)
 Halling
 Melankoli (Melancholy)
 Springtanz (Spring dance, composed 1872?; revised 1888)
 Elegi (Elegy)

Book V, Op. 54 (composed 1889–91; published 1891; Nos. 1–4 later orchestrated as Lyric Suite):

 Gjetergutt (Shepherd's boy)
 Gangar (Norwegian march)
 Trolltog (March of the Dwarfs)
 Notturno 
 Scherzo
 Klokkeklang (Bell ringing)

Book VI, Op. 57 (composed 1890?–3; published 1893):
 Svundne dager (Vanished days)
 Gade
 Illusjon (Illusion)
 Geheimniss (Secret)
 Sie tanzt (She dances)
 Heimweh (Homesickness)

Book VII, Op. 62 (composed 1893?–5; published 1895):
 Sylfide (Sylph)
 Takk (Gratitude)
 Fransk serenade (French serenade)
 Bekken (Brooklet)
 Drømmesyn (Phantom)
 Hjemad (Homeward)

Book VIII, Op. 65 (composed 1896; published 1897):

 Fra ungdomsdagene (From early years)
 Bondens sang (Peasant's song)
 Tungsinn (Melancholy)
 Salong (Salon)
 I balladetone (Ballad)
 Bryllupsdag på Troldhaugen (Wedding Day at Troldhaugen)

Book IX, Op. 68 (composed 1898-9; published 1899; Nos. 4 and 5 were orchestrated in 1899):
 Matrosenes oppsang (Sailors' song)
 Bestemors menuet (Grandmother's minuet)
 For dine føtter (At your feet)
 Aften på højfjellet (Evening in the mountains)
 Bådnlåt (At the cradle)
 Valse mélancolique (Melancholy waltz)

Book X, Op. 71 (composed and published 1901):

 Det var engang (Once upon a time)
 Sommeraften (Summer's eve)
 Småtroll (Puck)
 Skogstillhet (Peace in the woods)
 Halling
 Forbi (Gone)
 Efterklang (Remembrances)

See also
List of compositions by Edvard Grieg

References

Bibliography
Grieg, Edvard (2008): Thematisch-Bibliographisches Werkverzeichnis, ed. Dan Fog, Kirsti Grinde and Øyvind Norheim. Frankfurt/Main Leipzig London New York: Henry Litolffs Verlag 
Horton, John and Nils Grinde, "Edvard Grieg," Grove Music Online, ed. L. Macy (accessed 25 May 2008) 
Krellmann, Hanspeter (2008): Griegs lyrische Klavierstücke: Ein musikalischer Werkführer. München: C.H. Beck

External links

Compositions by Edvard Grieg
Compositions for solo piano